Isidro Sánchez García-Figueras (17 December 1936 – 2 September 2013), sometimes known simply as Isidro, was a Spanish footballer who played as a right back.

Club career
During his 15-year professional career, Barcelona-born Sánchez played for three clubs. He started out in 1956 at Real Betis, scoring a career-best five goals – in only 15 matches – in his fourth season and helping the Andalusians to the sixth place in La Liga, while playing as a midfielder.

In 1961, Sánchez joined fellow league team Real Madrid, being an important defensive unit as the side won four consecutive league titles, including the double in his first year. After only one game in the 1964–65 campaign, aged nearly 29, he returned to his native region and signed for CE Sabadell FC, where he would remain until his retirement in June 1971. 

Sánchez never suffered relegation since arriving in the top division, making 262 appearances in the competition. He died on 2 September 2013 at the age of 76, in Seville.

Personal life
Sánchez was married to Carmen Flores, sister of flamenco singer-dancer Lola Flores. His son, Enrique, was also a footballer and a defender, representing mainly Valencia CF and Real Madrid and later embarking in a successful coaching career.

References

External links

Betisweb stats and bio 
Madridista stats 

1936 births
2013 deaths
Footballers from Jerez de la Frontera
Footballers from Barcelona
Spanish footballers
Association football defenders
La Liga players
Segunda División players
Tercera División players
Real Betis players
Real Madrid CF players
CE Sabadell FC footballers
Spain under-21 international footballers